The 1990–91 Green Bay Phoenix men's basketball team represented the University of Wisconsin–Green Bay during the 1990–91 NCAA Division I men's basketball season. Their head coach was Dick Bennett. They were the champions of the Mid-Continent Basketball tournament to earn the conference's automatic bid in the 1991 NCAA tournament, the school's second ever appearance in the tournament. As the 12 seed in the West region, the Phoenix fell to Michigan State in the opening round, 60–58.

Roster

Schedule and results

|-
!colspan=9 style=| Regular season

|-
!colspan=9 style=|Mid-Continent Conference tournament

|-
!colspan=9 style=|NCAA tournament

 
Sources:

Awards and honors
Tony Bennett – Mid-Con Player of the Year

References 

Green Bay Phoenix men's basketball seasons
Green Bay Phoenix men's basket
Green Bay Phoenix Men's
Green Bay